Euphorbia lactea is a species of spurge native to tropical Asia, mainly in India.

The leaves are minute, and soon deciduous. All parts of the plant contain a poisonous milky latex. Common names include mottled spurge, frilled fan, elkhorn, candelabra spurge, candelabrum tree, candelabra cactus, candelabra plant, dragon bones, false cactus, hatrack cactus, milkstripe euphorbia, mottled candlestick.

It is used medicinally in India. It is widely grown as an ornamental plant, both in the tropics, and as a houseplant in temperate regions; a number of cultivars have been selected for ornamental use, notably 'Cristata' with frilled branching.

References

lactea